The Diocese of Peterborough forms part of the Province of Canterbury in England. Its seat is the Cathedral Church of Saint Peter, Saint Paul and Saint Andrew, which was founded as a monastery in AD 655 and re-built in its present form between 1118 and 1238.

History
Founded at the Dissolution of the Monasteries in 1541 (it was until then part of the Diocese of Lincoln), the Diocese has parishes in:
The Soke of Peterborough
The county of Northamptonshire and
The county of Rutland.

Until 1927 the Peterborough diocese covered what is now the (modern) Diocese of Leicester.

Peterborough Abbey became a cathedral at the Reformation, one of six wholly new bishoprics founded under Henry VIII.  On 4 September 1541 letters patent were issued converting the abbey church of Peterborough into a cathedral church, with a dean and chapter and ecclesiastical staff.  The last abbot, John Chambers, was consecrated in his former abbey church on 23 October 1541 as the first Bishop of Peterborough.

A link with the Anglican Church of Kenya Diocese of Bungoma was formed by the two bishops following the Lambeth Conference in 1998.

Organisation
The Diocese is divided into two Archdeaconries:
The Archdeaconry of Northampton, and
The Archdeaconry of Oakham.

The parts of the City of Peterborough that are south of the River Nene and so, were in the historic county of Huntingdonshire rather than the Soke of Peterborough, fall within the Diocese of Ely. The Bishop of Peterborough has been commissioned as Assistant Bishop in the Ely Diocese so he can exercise pastoral care in these parishes, which include Stanground, Orton, Woodston, Yaxley and Fletton. Thorney, historically in the Isle of Ely and now within the boundaries of the Peterborough unitary authority area, is unaffected by this arrangement.

Bishops
The Bishop of Peterborough (Donald Allister) leads the diocese, and is assisted by the Bishop suffragan of Brixworth (John Holbrook). The suffragan see of Brixworth was created by Order in Council on 26 July 1988.

Alternative episcopal oversight (for parishes in the diocese which reject the ministry of priests who are women) is provided by the provincial episcopal visitor, Norman Banks, Bishop suffragan of Richborough, who is licensed as an honorary assistant bishop of the diocese in order to facilitate his work there. There is also one former bishop, Ed Condry, living in the diocese who is licensed as honorary assistant bishop.

See also
Bishop of Peterborough
Peterborough Cathedral

References

External links
Diocese of Peterborough

Peterborough
1541 establishments in England
Religious organizations established in the 1540s
Peterborough
Christianity in Peterborough
Religion in Northamptonshire
Religion in Rutland
Anglican Diocese of Peterborough